Leavenworth USD 453 is a public unified school district headquartered in Leavenworth, Kansas, United States.

Administration
The school district is currently under the administration of Superintendent, Mike Roth.

Board of Education
The Leavenworth School District is governed by a seven-member Board of Education. In Leavenworth, school board members are elected at large by the entire community. The board meets on the third Wednesday, of each month, at the Leavenworth Administrative Office.

Schools
The school district operates the following schools:
 Leavenworth High School (9–12)
 Richard W. Warren Middle School (7–8)
 Leavenworth Intermediate School (part of the Warren campus (5-6)
 Anthony Elementary School (1–4)
 David Brewer Elementary School (1–4)
 Henry Leavenworth Elementary School (1–4)
 Earl Lawson Early Education Center (preK-K)
 Nettie Hartnett Education Center (3rd Avenue School, Quest 18-21 Program, Virtual School)

See also
 Fort Leavenworth USD 207
 List of high schools in Kansas
 List of unified school districts in Kansas
 Kansas State Department of Education
 Kansas State High School Activities Association

References

External links
 

Education in Leavenworth County, Kansas
School districts in Kansas